The 1931 Ohio Bobcats football team was an American football team that represented Ohio University as a member of the Buckeye Athletic Association (BAA) during the 1931 college football season. In their eighth season under head coach Don Peden, the Bobcats compiled a 7–1 record, won the BAA championship, shut out six of eight opponents, and outscored all opponents by a total of 172 to 14.

Schedule

References

Ohio
Ohio Bobcats football seasons
Ohio Bobcats football